This is a list of notable alumni, professors and staff affiliated with the Aga Khan University.

Government, public service, and public policy
Prof. Abdul Gaffar Billoo - Pakistani pediatric endocrinologist at Aga Khan University 
Sahabzada Yaqub Khan - former foreign minister of Pakistan

Notable alumni
Adil Haider - trauma surgeon and outcomes research scientist in the United States 
Naeem Rahim - nephrologist and founder of the Idaho-based JRM Foundation for Humanity

References

 
Lists of people by university or college in Pakistan